All in a Night's Work is a 1961 American Technicolor romantic screwball comedy film directed by Joseph Anthony and starring Dean Martin and Shirley MacLaine.

Plot
Tony Ryder's uncle, the wealthy publisher of magazines, has just died. The young playboy Tony inherits the paper but is left with a board of directors that thinks he's unsuited for the task, plus a hotel detective who thinks Tony should know about a girl who was seen running away from his uncle's Palm Beach hotel room, wearing nothing but a Turkish towel and an earring, on the night of his death.

Tony discovers that the young lady in question, Katie Robbins, is employed in his own research department. The board decrees that he must send in the detective to watch her and head off any attempts at blackmail. But the more time Tony spends trying to get Katie to open up about what her relationship to his uncle was, the less he cares. Complications ensue in the form of Ms. Robbins's fiancé—he's a strait-laced veterinarian—and the board's insistence that Katie be silenced at all costs.

Cast
Dean Martin as Tony Ryder
Shirley MacLaine as Katie Robbins
Cliff Robertson as Warren Kingsley, Jr.
Charles Ruggles as Dr. Warren Kingsley, Sr. (billed as Charlie Ruggles)
Norma Crane as Marge Coombs
Jack Weston as Lasker
John Hudson as Harry Lane
Jerome Cowan as Sam Weaver
Gale Gordon as Oliver Dunnin
Ralph Dumke as Baker
Mabel Albertson as Mrs. Kingsley
Rex Evans as Carter
Mary Treen as Miss Schuster
Roy Gordon as Albright
Ian Wolfe as O'Hara
Rosemarie Stack as Tony's Blonde 'Friend' (uncredited)

See also
 List of American films of 1961

References

External links
 
 
 

1961 films
1961 romantic comedy films
American romantic comedy films
American screwball comedy films
1960s English-language films
Films scored by André Previn
Films based on multiple works
Films based on short fiction
American films based on plays
Films directed by Joseph Anthony
Films produced by Hal B. Wallis
Films set in Florida
Paramount Pictures films
1960s American films